Yehezkel Flomin (2 August 1935 – 16 October 2019) was an Israeli politician who served as a member of the Knesset for Likud between 1974 and 1981.

Biography
Born in Jerusalem during the Mandate era, Flomin attended the Tikhon Alef high school in Tel Aviv before studying law and economics at Tel Aviv University. He became a member of the university's faculty in 1962, working there until 1969. Between 1971 and 1972 he was a member of the Hebrew University of Jerusalem's faculty.

A member of the Liberal Party, Flomin chaired its youth leadership and was a member of the party's directorate. He was elected to the Knesset on the Likud list (an alliance of Herut, the Liberal Party and several other small right-wing parties) in 1973, taking his seat the following year. He was re-elected in 1977, and was appointed Deputy Minister of Finance on 28 June that year, holding the post until 30 July 1979.

He lost his seat in the 1981 elections, and in 1986 left the Liberal Party to establish the Liberal Centre Party.

Flomin died on 16 October 2019 at the age of 84.

References

External links

1935 births
2019 deaths
People from Jerusalem
Jews in Mandatory Palestine
Tel Aviv University alumni
Israeli academics
Academic staff of Tel Aviv University
Academic staff of the Hebrew University of Jerusalem
Likud politicians
Liberal Party (Israel) politicians
Members of the 8th Knesset (1974–1977)
Members of the 9th Knesset (1977–1981)
Deputy ministers of Israel